Denis Rampersad (born 22 September 1974) is a Trinidadian cricketer. He played in 22 first-class and 3 List A matches for Trinidad and Tobago from 1996 to 2001.

See also
 List of Trinidadian representative cricketers

References

External links
 

1974 births
Living people
Trinidad and Tobago cricketers
Trinidad and Tobago people of Indian descent